The 1897 Haverford football team was an American football team that represented Haverford College as an independent during the 1897 college football season. The team compiled an 8–1 record and outscored opponents by a total of 153 to 22. Thomas Branson was the coach, and Varney was the captain.

Schedule

References

Haverford
Haverford Fords football seasons
Haverford football